Lever Brothers was a British manufacturing company founded in 1885 by two brothers: William Hesketh Lever, 1st Viscount Leverhulme (1851–1925), and James Darcy Lever (1854–1916). They invested in and successfully promoted a new soap-making process invented by chemist William Hough Watson. Lever Brothers entered the United States market in 1895 and acquired Mac Fisheries, owner of T. Wall & Sons, in 1925. Lever Brothers was one of several British companies that took an interest in the welfare of its British employees. Its brands included "Lifebuoy", "Lux" and "Vim". Lever Brothers merged with Margarine Unie to form Unilever in 1929.

History 
Starting with a small grocery business begun by his father, William Lever and his brother James entered the soap business in 1885 by buying a small soap works in Warrington. The brothers teamed up with a Cumbrian chemist, William Hough Watson, who became an early business partner. Watson invented the process which resulted in a new soap, using glycerin and vegetable oils such as palm oil, rather than tallow.<ref name="watson">Jeannifer Filly Sumayku, The President Post, 22 March 2010</ref> The resulting soap was a good, free-lathering soap, at first named Honey Soap then later named "Sunlight Soap". Production reached 450 tons per week by 1888. Larger premises were built on marshes at Bromborough Pool on the Wirral Peninsula at what became Port Sunlight, then part of Cheshire. Though the company was named Lever Brothers, William Lever's brother and co-director James never took a major part in running the business. He fell ill in 1895, probably as a result of diabetes, and resigned his directorship two years later.

Lever Brothers entered the United States market in 1895, with a small New York City sales office. In 1898, it bought a soap manufacturer in Cambridge, Massachusetts, the Curtis Davis Company, moved its U.S. headquarters to Cambridge and started production at a factory located at what is now Technology Square. By 1929, Lever Brothers employed 1,000 workers in Cambridge, and 1,400 nationwide, making it the third-largest soap manufacturer in the U.S.

In 1925, Lever Brothers acquired Mac Fisheries, owner of T. Wall & Sons.

 Employee welfare and use of forced labour 
Lever Brothers was one of several British companies that took an interest in the welfare of its British employees. The model village of Port Sunlight, then in Cheshire, was developed between 1888 and 1914 adjoining the soap factory to accommodate the company's staff in good quality housing, with high architectural standards and many community facilities. The paternalism found at Port Sunlight did not exist in the operations of its subsidiary in the Belgian Congo, where Lever Brothers, through their subsidiary Huileries du Congo Belge'' (HCB), utilised forced labour between 1911 and 1945.

Brands
By 1911, the company had its own oil palm plantations in the Belgian Congo and the Solomon Islands. Lever Brothers Ltd also acquired other soap companies including A&F Pears, John Knight of London, Gossage's of Widnes, Watson's of Leeds, Crosfield's of Warrington, Hazlehurst & Sons of Runcorn and Hudson's of Liverpool. The town of Leverville (the present-day Lusanga) was founded in the then district of Kwango, later part of the Province of Léopoldville, in the western part of the Belgian Congo and was named after William Lever (later Viscount Leverhulme).

Unilever 
In September 1929, Unilever was formed by a merger of the operations of Dutch Margarine Unie and British soapmaker Lever Brothers, named as a blend of the two firms' names.  By 1930, it employed 250,000 people and in terms of market value, was the largest company in Britain. Unilever was the first modern multinational company.

The Lever Brothers name was kept for a time as an imprint, as well as the name of the US subsidiary, Lever Brothers Company, and a Canadian subsidiary, Lever Brothers Limited. Lever Brothers was sold to a US capital firm, Pensler Capital Corporation, and renamed Korex in 2008. Korex Don Valley assumed operations of the Lever Brothers Toronto plant. It has since closed and gone bankrupt. The Toronto plant is now being redeveloped into an office and industrial district by First Gulf Corporation.

Presidents 
Among its presidents was Charles Luckman who in the 1950s championed the construction of the Lever House in New York City. Luckman left the company before the building's completion, moving on to a notable architectural career, including the design of Madison Square Garden, the Theme Building, the master plan for Los Angeles International Airport, the Aon Center, and major buildings at the Kennedy Space Center and Johnson Space Center.

See also 
 Breeze detergent
 Lever & Kitchen (disambiguation)
 Lever Brothers Factory originally located in Balmain, New South Wales, Australia
 Lever Brothers Factory, Toronto - re-development of Lever's Toronto factory and now being re-developed by First Gulf Corporation into a residential community.
 Port Sunlight
 Levers Pacific Plantations

Notes

References

External links

Defunct manufacturing companies of the United Kingdom
Unilever companies
Defunct companies based in London
Manufacturing companies established in 1885
Manufacturing companies disestablished in 1930
1885 establishments in England
British companies established in 1885
1930 disestablishments in England
British Royal Warrant holders
Palm oil production in the Democratic Republic of the Congo
British companies disestablished in 1930
Lever family
1930 mergers and acquisitions